Macau International Airport  is an international airport in the special administrative region of Macau, situated at the eastern end of Taipa island and neighbouring waters which opened for commercial operations on 9 November 1995, during Portuguese administration of the region.

Since then the airport has been a common transfer point for people traveling between the Mainland and Taiwan, as well as a passenger hub for destinations in mainland China and Southeast Asia. During 2006, the airport handled 5 million passengers and 220,000 tonnes of cargo. In 2017 the number of passengers had increased to 7,165,803, which is more than the 6 million passengers per year the terminal was originally designed for.

History
In April 1996, TAP Air Portugal started service to Lisbon using Airbus A340s. They cooperated with Sabena on the route; the flight stopped in Brussels, and TAP allocated a certain number of seats to Sabena on the segment between Brussels and Macau. Within a few months of the launch, TAP began to encounter difficulties. The crew had to spend long layovers in Macau because the service only operated twice a week. Additionally, TAP and Air Macau, in which the former held a stake, were unable to coordinate their schedules, making connections between the Lisbon flight and Air Macau's network inconvenient. TAP later moved the stopover to Bangkok in hopes of improving passenger counts. In 1997, Airline Business reported that the carrier was losing money on the route. TAP's chairman wanted to end it but faced opposition from the Portuguese government, which owned the airline. TAP stopped serving Macau the following year.

Facilities

Terminal
The airport's designed capacity is 6,000,000 passengers per year, with processing capacity of up to 2,000 passengers per hour.  The airport does not have a night curfew. There are 24 parking spaces for aircraft in the apron, with five jetways. There are 10 gates. As in Hong Kong, Macau has its own immigration policies and is a separate customs territory from mainland China. All travellers, including those to mainland China and Hong Kong, need to go through the immigration and customs inspections of international flights.

Runway and aprons
The airport's runway was built on a strip of reclaimed land in the sea, adjacent to Taipa Island, where the main terminal and air traffic control facilities are located, unlike in Hong Kong, where Chek Lap Kok has them all on a reclaimed island. The runway is connected to the apron by two causeways. Runway 34 is ILS CAT II equipped. Navigational and radio aids are located at either end of the runway. Despite its small area, the airport is capable of handling Boeing 747s and Antonov 124s, which forms a vital freight link between local manufacturers and overseas markets. Its catering facility can produce up to 10,000 meals per day.

Other tenants
Other tenants of the airport are the Macau Customs Service (Independent department under Secretariat for Security of Macau), the Macau Immigration Department/Services (Public Security Police Force of Macau), the Macau Business Aviation Centre, Servair Macau and Menzies Macau.

Redevelopment
Since 2016, Macau's government has been developing a master plan for the airport's expansion. To be done in three phases, the most visible sections of it broke ground in 2020.

Airlines and destinations

Passenger

Cargo

Statistics

Annual traffic

Busiest routes

Ground transportation
The airport is connected by public transit bus routes, light rail, taxis, private cars, and regional coach services.

Air–sea link
For passengers transferring to China or Hong Kong, a "two customs, one checkpoint" service is provided. Passengers can use a bus shuttle directly from the airport to the New Macau Ferry Terminal or the Taipa Ferry Terminal without passing Macau immigration.

Bus
Towards Macau Peninsula, Taipa, Cotai and Coloane
Transmac routes: 
26 – Bacia Norte do Patane ↔ Mercado Municipal de Coloane
51A – The Praia ↔ Av. Vale das Borboletas
AP1 – Portas do Cerco ↺ Aeroporto de Macau
AP1X – Praça das Portas do Cerco ↺ Aeroporto de Macau (06:00–10:00, 15:00–20:00)
MT4 – Parque M. Dr. Sun Yat Sen ↔ Terminal Marítimo de Passageiros da Taipa
T.C.M. routes: 
N2 – Bacia Norte do Patane ↔ Terminal Marítimo de Passageiros da Taipa (00:00–06:00)
36 – Rotunda Leonel Sousa ↺ Aeroporto de Macau
MT1 – Praceta 24 de Junho ↺ Aeroporto de Macau

Cross-border coaches
Cross-border coaches connect Macau International Airport with mainland locations like Huadao, Guangzhou, Panyu, Dongguan, Gongbei Port of Entry and Hengqin Border. The "two customs, one checkpoint" service is also available at the Hengqin Border.

Light rail
The airport is served by the Airport Station of the Macau Light Rail Transit's Taipa Line at Avenida Wai Long.

See also
Civil Aviation Authority of Macau SAR

References

External links

 
 
 
 

Airports in Macau
Taipa
Artificial island airports
Airports established in 1995
1995 establishments in Macau
Artificial islands of China